Irina Plotnikova is a Russian pianist.

Irina Plotnikova won the inaugural Sydney International Piano Competition (1977), and presented the Opening Recital at the 1985 and 2000 competitions.

She is now a professor at the Tchaikovsky Conservatory.

References

Russian classical pianists
Russian women pianists
Sydney International Piano Competition prize-winners
Living people
21st-century classical pianists
1954 births
Women classical pianists
21st-century women pianists